Poitea carinalis is a small deciduous tree of dry shrub and when in flower, usually February–April (occasionally up to June, depending on dry season rains), an individual Poitea (Sabinea) can be seen from a mile away as the entire tree turns  brilliant red, the flowers have the typical pea form with a long keel. Scattered individuals occur throughout the dry shrub and are occasionally planted elsewhere and since it has been adopted as the national flower of Dominica, people are now encouraged to plant it more widely. The flowers appear just before the new leaves unfurl and attract an abundance of insects, hummingbirds and bananaquits, but last for only a short time. Out of flower, it has 6-8 pairs of leaflets and a flattened pod. It is endemic to Dominica (one related species in Puerto Rico and Virgin Islands).

References

External links
 Ntbg.org
 Da-academy.org
 Searchdominica.com
 Ecflora.cavehill.uwi.edu
 Flickr.com
 Theplantlist.org

Robinieae
Trees of Dominica
Endemic flora of Dominica